Downtown Vancouver is the central business district and the city centre neighbourhood of Vancouver, Canada, on the northwestern shore of the Burrard Peninsula in the Lower Mainland region of British Columbia. It occupies most of the north shore of the False Creek inlet, which cuts into the Burrard Peninsula creating the Downtown Peninsula, where the West End neighbourhood and Stanley Park are also located.

Along with West End, Stanley Park and the nearby Downtown Eastside, Downtown makes up Central Vancouver, one of the city's three main areas (the others being East Side and West Side).

With a disproportionately high amount of residential towers for a central business district in a geographically constrained area, Downtown Vancouver is one of the densest areas in the country.

Geography

The Downtown area is generally considered to be bounded by Burrard Inlet to the north, West End to the west, Granville Island/Fairview and Mount Pleasant across the False Creek to the south, and Downtown Eastside and Strathcona to the east and southeast. Most unofficial sources also include West End and Stanley Park into Downtown (the so-called "Downtown Peninsula"), but the City of Vancouver officially defines them as separate neighbourhoods.
 
Besides the readily identifiable office towers of the financial and central business districts, Downtown Vancouver also includes residential neighbourhoods in the form of high-rise apartments and condominiums in Yaletown and Coal Harbour, and other Downtown neighbourhoods include the Granville Mall and Entertainment District, Downtown South, Gastown, Chinatown and Japantown.

Notable sub-neighbourhoods
Yaletown is the heritage area of Downtown, located along False Creek and the seawall. Formerly home to the Vancouver's warehouses, the area has been revitalized with commercial and residential developments, and is now home to an upper middle class with a mix of condominiums and apartments.
Coal Harbour is the Vancouver's former port area. Like Yaletown, the area has been redeveloped for residences and some business, and is now home to high-income residents.
Gastown is another heritage area of the city, and some streets are still cobblestone. Tourist shops are found near the notable Gastown Steam Clock. The area is mixed with lower- and middle class residents living in apartments, condos and lofts.
Chinatown is where many Chinese immigrants established their homes and businesses when they first moved to Vancouver. Residential areas are home to low-income residents in apartments. There are some warehouses still located in the area.
Crosstown is a roughly four-block area at the eastern edge of Chinatown, east of Yaletown and south of Gastown, connecting these three neighbourhoods. It's a compact, high-density neighborhood including high-end heritage buildings (include the historic Sun Tower), a row of heritage high-rise boutique loft conversions along Beatty Street, and nine mixed-use residential condos towers, all with easy access to major amenities of Downtown either by foot, SkyTrain or SeaBus.  As one of the fastest-growing area of Downtown with an influx of new investments and businesses, the neighbourhood offers parks, traditional restaurants, coffee/tea shops, outdoor markets, clothing and many more retail shops.
Japantown was an old neighbourhood located east of Gastown, that once had a concentration of Japanese immigrants. It ceased to be a distinctly ethnic Japanese area during World War II when Japanese Canadians were interned and had their properties permanently confiscated by the King government, and although some Japanese returned after the war, the community never revived to the original state. As the Japantown ceased to exist, the area is now often marketed as Railtown by real estate developers due to the proximity of the West Coast Express railways.

Demographics

Architecture

The downtown area includes most of the remaining historic buildings and many of the larger notable buildings in the region. All but one of Vancouver's tallest buildings are located within Downtown Vancouver, the one being Marine Gateway North located next to Marine Drive station.

Sports
There are two major sporting facilities in the downtown core, Rogers Arena (formerly GM Place) and BC Place Stadium. The NHL's Vancouver Canucks play at Rogers Arena, while the CFL's BC Lions and the MLS's Vancouver Whitecaps FC use the neighbouring BC Place Stadium. SkyTrain Stadium-Chinatown station provides easy rapid transit access to the district.

Transportation

The presence of water on three sides limits access to downtown Vancouver. There are four major bridges: the Lions Gate Bridge, connecting to the North Shore municipalities and the Trans Canada Highway, and the Burrard Street Bridge, Cambie Street Bridge, and Granville Street Bridge, which provide access to the commercial and residential areas south of False Creek.

The historic Waterfront station is the principal transit hub for the downtown core. There are six subway stations located in downtown Vancouver running on two SkyTrain lines: the Expo Line and Canada Line. The Expo Line travels from Waterfront station at the foot of the central harbor and through Dunsmuir Tunnel to the east. The Canada Line travels from Waterfront station and tunnels south under Granville Street and Davie Street, linking downtown to central Richmond and Vancouver International Airport. SeaBus is a passenger-only ferry that connects from Waterfront station to the North Shore in 10–12 minutes. The West Coast Express commuter rail system travels from Waterfront station to the eastern suburbs and exurbs. The West Coast Express travels from Waterfront to Moody Centre, Coquitlam Central, Port Coquitlam, Pitt Meadows, Maple Meadows Station, Port Haney and Mission City as its terminus station Terminals are also available near Waterfront station for float planes and helicopters. 

Most north-south Vancouver bus routes serve Downtown Vancouver, in addition to suburban routes from the North Shore and Burnaby. The bus rapid transit line 98 B-Line had eight stops in the downtown core, primarily along Seymour Street and Burrard Street. This service was replaced on August 17, 2009, by SkyTrain's Canada Line. The 95 B-Line started service in December 2016 in conjunction with the opening of the Evergreen Extension, connecting downtown to Simon Fraser University along Hastings Street.

There are two private passenger water taxi operators (False Creek Ferries and The Aquabus), providing service between several downtown neighbourhoods, False Creek, and Granville Island.

The city is planning to extend the downtown streetcar from its current route of Granville Island to the Main Street SkyTrain station, with future plans extending it to Chinatown and then to Stanley Park.

Notes

References

External links

 City of Vancouver Community Profiles: Downtown
 Downtown page, Vancouver Then and Now website, comparisons of old photos with modern locations

Vancouver
Economy of Vancouver
Geography of Vancouver
Neighbourhoods in Vancouver